Allan Stewart (12 April 1865 – 2 October 1907) was a Scottish footballer who played as a right half.

Career
Born in Kilmarnock and raised in the south of Glasgow, Stewart played club football for Queen's Park and won the Scottish Cup with the club in 1890 – he scored  the winning goal in the replayed final, as he had also done in that season's Glasgow Cup final (despite his defensive role, he was known for his powerful shooting from distance). Soon afterwards he quit the game and relocated to London. He had also played as a guest for Cowlairs in one competitive fixture: the final of the 1888 Glasgow Exhibition Cup, and scored in that victory too.

Stewart made two appearances for Scotland, in British Home Championship fixtures against Wales and Ireland. He featured once for the English amateur team Corinthian.

Notes

References

1865 births
1907 deaths
Scottish footballers
Footballers from Kilmarnock
Footballers from Glasgow
Scotland international footballers
Queen's Park F.C. players
Cowlairs F.C. players
Association football wing halves
Corinthian F.C. players